Pakistan–Serbia relations refer to the bilateral ties between the Islamic Republic of Pakistan and the Republic of Serbia. Pakistan has maintained an embassy in Belgrade since 2001; Serbia closed its embassy in Islamabad in 2001 due to financial reasons, and is now represented in Pakistan through its embassy in Beijing, China. On 24 December 2012, Pakistan granted diplomatic recognition to the Republic of Kosovo, a partially recognized state that is claimed by Serbia in its entirety as the autonomous province of Kosovo and Metohija. The Serbian government has not yet responded to the Pakistani move of recognizing Kosovo as an independent state.

See also 
 Pakistan–Yugoslavia relations, bilateral ties between Pakistan and Yugoslavia before the latter's collapse
 Yugoslavia and the Non-Aligned Movement, Yugoslavia's role as a founding member of the Non-Aligned Movement
 Inter-Services Intelligence activities in Bosnia and Herzegovina, covert Pakistani intelligence activities against Serb forces during the Yugoslav Wars

References

External links 
  Serbian embassy in Beijing (also accredited to Pakistan)
  Pakistani embassy in Belgrade

 
Serbia
Bilateral relations of Serbia